Quit rent, quit-rent, or quitrent is a tax or land tax imposed on occupants of freehold or leased land in lieu of services to a higher landowning authority, usually a government or its assigns.

Under feudal law, the payment of quit rent (Latin Quietus Redditus, pl. Redditus Quieti) freed the tenant of a holding from the obligation to perform such other services as were obligatory under feudal tenure, or freed the occupier of the land from the burden of having others use their own distinct rights that affected the land (e.g. hunting rights which would have hindered farming). Thus it was a payment for distinct rights that were connected with the full enjoyment of the land but not parcelled up in the ownership of the land. Formally it was a sort of buy-back rather than a tax. A tax can be varied by the taxer; and if not paid there are penalties that can be varied by the taxer without formal limit. In contrast the only sanction for not paying a feudal quit rent was that the alternative burdens would return. This imposed a ceiling on how much could be demanded in payment of a quit rent. Where the sanctions for non-compliance are limited in this way, a quit rent is a rent in form and name, and not a tax; where they are not so limited, a quit rent is a rent only in form and name, being rather a tax. The latter is the usual case today, as the former was in earlier times.

In post-feudal times, quit rents have continued to be imposed by some governments, usually attached to land grants as a form of land tax.

The quit rent system was used frequently by colonial governments in the British Empire. Many land grants in colonial America in the 17th and 18th centuries carried quit rent. Quit rents went on to be used in British colonies, protectorates, etc. in Asia and elsewhere in the 19th and 20th centuries. For example, in British North Borneo, Proclamation IX of 1902 made it a legal requirement for natives who claimed to own cultivated lands to take out separate land titles for themselves, charged at $2.00 per title with owners made to pay annual quit rent.

Some governments have now abolished the quit rent system and relieved those with a nominal quit rent obligation from the requirement to pay it, replacing quit rents with a uniform system of land tax. However, in other countries, such as Malaysia, quit rent remains an important means of raising revenue from landowners.

See also
Quit Rents ceremony

References

External links

Renting
Feudalism
Land tenure